Haviva Ner-David (formerly Haviva Krasner-Davidson) is an Israeli feminist activist and rabbi.

Biography
She received her BA from Columbia University and her PhD from Bar Ilan University and wrote her thesis concerning the nature of the relationship between Tumah (ritual impurity) and Niddah (a menstruant woman). In 1993 she applied to Yeshiva University’s rabbinical program, RIETS and never received an official response. Despite this early rejection, she went on to become one of the first women known to have controversially been granted the equivalent of Orthodox Semicha (rabbinic ordination), which she received from Rabbi Dr. Aryeh Strikovsky of Tel-Aviv in 2006. In 2000 she wrote a book documenting her journey and aspirations as a female rabbi entitled, Life on the Fringes: A Feminist Journey Toward Traditional Rabbinic Ordination. She subsequently left Orthodoxy and now identifies as a “post-denominational rabbi.”
She advocates arguably non-Orthodox practices such as egalitarian Tefilah and unmarried women practicing mikveh before engaging in pre-marital sex.

She is the founding director of Reut: The Center for Modern Jewish Marriage, a marriage center in Jerusalem that helps couples plan a more woman-friendly ceremony and ketubah, and provides legal and financial advice, couples counseling, and a mikveh open to couples.
Ner-David is currently the Director of "Shmaya": A Ritual and Educational Mikveh, and the founding director of Reut: The Center for Modern Jewish Marriage. She has also written Chanah’s Voice: A Rabbi Wrestles with Gender, Commandment, and the Women’s Rituals of Baking, Bathing, and Brightening (2013, Ben Yehudah Press). She lives on Kibbutz Hannaton in northern Israel with her husband and seven children.

Haviva Ner-David was among the few Orthodox women rabbis to have received private ordination in the Orthodox Jewish context before the institutional change that resulted in the founding of Yeshivat Maharat. Other women in her position include Mimi Feigelson (ordained in 1994) and Dina Najman (ordained in 2006).

See also
 Dina Brawer
 Shira Marili Mirvis
 Gender and Judaism
 Jewish feminism
 Jewish view of marriage

Notes and references

External links
 
 Jerusalem Post: For the Sake of Righteous Women by Peggy Cidor
 A History of Women's Ordination as Rabbis by Avi Hein
 Reut: The Center for Modern Jewish Marriage 

1969 births
Living people
Bar-Ilan University alumni
Israeli Orthodox Jews
Israeli feminists
Israeli women activists
Orthodox Jewish feminists
Orthodox women rabbis
Columbia College (New York) alumni